The women's foil was one of eight fencing events on the fencing at the 1960 Summer Olympics programme. It was the eighth appearance of the event. The competition was held from 31 August – 1 September 1960. 56 fencers from 24 nations competed.

Competition format 
The competition used a pool play format, with each fencer facing the other fencers in the pool in a round robin. Bouts were to 4 touches. Barrages were used to break ties necessary for advancement. However, only as much fencing was done as was necessary to determine advancement, so some bouts never occurred if the fencers advancing from the pool could be determined. The competition involved 4 rounds:
 Round 1: 9 pools, 6 or 7 fencers to a pool, top 3 advance (total 27 advancing)
 Quarterfinals: 4 pools, 6 or 7 fencers to a pool, top 3 advance (total 12 advancing)
 Semifinals: 2 pools, 6 fencers to a pool, top 4 advance (total 8 advancing)
 Final: 1 pool, 8 fencers

Results

Round 1

The top three fencers in each pool advanced.

Round 1 Pool A

Round 1 Pool B

 Barrage

Round 1 Pool C

Round 1 Pool D

Round 1 Pool E

 Barrage

Round 1 Pool F

Round 1 Pool G

Round 1 Pool H

Espino de Saures of Panama was entered in this pool but did not start.

 Barrage

Round 1 Pool I

Quarterfinals

Quarterfinal A

Quarterfinal B 

 Barrage

Quarterfinal C

Quarterfinal D 

 Barrage

Semifinals

Semifinal A

Semifinal B

Final 
A three-way tie for third place required a barrage for the bronze medal (along with 4th and 5th place). The tie for 6th place was broken by touches received.

 Barrage

Overall standings

References

Foil women
Olym
Fen